Kassite is a rare mineral whose chemical formula is CaTi2O4(OH)2. It crystallizes in the orthorhombic crystal system and forms radiating rosettes and pseudo-hexagonal tabular crystals which are commonly twinned. Kassite crystals are brownish pink to pale yellow in color, are translucent, and have an adamantine luster. Cleavage is distinctly visible, and the crystals are very brittle. 

It was first described in 1965 in the Afrikanda pyroxenite massif, a formation on Russia's Kola Peninsula and was named for Nikolai Grigorievich Kassin (1885–1949), a prominent Russian geologist. It occurs as miarolytic cavity fillings of alkalic pegmatites in the Kola occurrence and in nepheline syenite in the Magnet Cove igneous complex of Arkansas, US. Its mineral association includes cafetite (which with it is also polymorphous), perovskite, titanite, rutile and ilmenite.

References

Oxide minerals
Monoclinic minerals
Minerals in space group 14